Proxalutamide (developmental code name GT-0918) is a nonsteroidal antiandrogen (NSAA) – specifically, a selective high-affinity silent antagonist of the androgen receptor (AR) – which is under development by Suzhou Kintor Pharmaceuticals, inc., a subsidiary of Kintor Pharmaceutical Limited, for the potential treatment of COVID-19, prostate cancer, and breast cancer. It was approved in Paraguay for the treatment of COVID-19 in July 2021, but has not been approved at this time in other countries.

Research

Prostate cancer 
Proxalutamide is in phase III studies for mCRPC as monotherapy and in combination with abiraterone. In the United States, it is in phase II study as monotherapy for mCRPC.

Other indications 
Proxalutamide is in phase Ic clinical trial in China.

See also 
 List of investigational sex-hormonal agents § Androgenics

References 

Experimental cancer drugs
Fluoroarenes
Hormonal antineoplastic drugs
Imidazolidines
Nitriles
Nonsteroidal antiandrogens
Oxazoles
Peripherally selective drugs
Pyridines
Trifluoromethyl compounds